Zabrus angustatus is a species of ground beetle in the Iberozabrus subgenus that can be found in Spain and Niger.

References

Beetles described in 1838
Beetles of Europe
Zabrus
Taxa named by Jules Pierre Rambur